Years link to the corresponding "[year] in poetry" articles.

Europe

Events
 The surviving Beowulf manuscript likely dates to the early 11th century.
 Emergence of Occitan as a literary language and of the first troubadors.
 King Bleddyn ap Cynfyn enacts new laws regulating the activities of Welsh bards and musicians around 1070.
 Earliest possible date for The Song of Roland

Poets
 Boyan, an early skald of Rus'.
 Bersi Skáldtorfuson flourishes in Iceland at the beginning of the century. He is captured at the naval Battle of Nesjar in 1016 and imprisoned.

Byzantine Empire

Poets
 Christopher of Mytilene
 John Mauropous

The Arabic World

Poets
Al-Saraqusti al-Jazzar, (11th century)
Samuel ibn Naghrillah (993–after 1056)

Births in the Arabic world
al-Sharif al-Radi, (born 1016)
Ibn Ammar (c. 1031–1086)
Ibn Khafajah, (born 1039)
 Moses ibn Ezra (c. 1055–1138), Hebrew poet in Al-Andalus
Ibn Quzman (1078–1160)

Deaths in the Arab world
Badi' al-Zaman al-Hamadhani (967–1007)
Abu ibn Abd Allah al-Ma'arri (973–1057)
Al-Mu'tamid ibn Abbad (Muhammad Ibn Abbad Al Mutamid) (1040–1095), poet-ruler in Al-Andalus
Ibn Ammar (c. 1031–1086), in Al-Andalus (killed by Al-Mu'tamid ibn Abbad)
Wallada bint al-Mustakfi (994–1091)

The Turkic World
 Oral traditions of Epic of Köroğlu
 Uyghur poet Yusuf Khass Hajib of Balasagun in the Kara-Khanid Khanate completes the Kutadgu Bilig ("The Wisdom Which Brings Good Fortune") and presents it to the prince of Kashgar in 462 (1069/1070 AD)

Persia

Works
 Firdawsi's Shahnameh is published in the first decade of the century
 Qabus-Nama
 Rubaiyat of Omar Khayyam dates to the end of the century
 Shahryar-Nama, attributed to Uthman Mukhtari
 Siyasatnama

Persian poets
 Baba Taher
 Rabi'a Balkhi, an early women poet
 Asad Gorgani
 Asjadi
 Ferdowsi, poet (925–1020)
 Omar Khayyám, poet (1048–1131)
 Hujviri (died 1073)
 Abusaeid Abolkheir (967–1049)
 Sanai Ghaznavi
 Abdul Qadir Jilani
 Manuchihri
 Sanaayi
 Abolfazl Beyhaghi, historian
 Naser Khosrow, traveller, writer and poet
 Farrokhi Sistani (فرخی سيستانی), poet
 Baba Tahir Oryan
 Rabi'ah Quzdari
 Abu-al-faraj Runi
 The author of Eskandar name the epic of Alexander (Novel)
 Keykavus Eskandar
 Nizam al-Mulk, author of Siyasatnama
 Tartusi novelist
 Azraqi
 Masud Sa'd Salman
 Uthman Mukhtari
 Qatran Tabrizi
 Mughatil ibn Bakri
 Asadi Tusi
 Surabadi
 Nizami Arudhi Samarqandi
 Imam Muhammad Ghazali
 Mohammad Raduyani
 Abhari
 Abu l-Abbas Rabinjani
 Abu-Ali Osmani
 Abul-Ma'ali

India

Events
 Beginning of Hoysala literature in Kannada and Sanskrit
 Nannayya, Aadi Kavi ("the first poet"), around 1022 begins work on Andhra Mahabharatam, a translation of the Mahabharata into Telugu and the first work of Telugu literature

Works
 Ramavataram (or earlier)

Poets
 Kambar, writing in Tamil
 Bilhana, Kashmiri

China

Chinese poets
Poet and polymath Su Shi is sent into internal exile 1080–1086 for political reasons. During this period he writes the first and second Chibifu ( "The Red Cliffs")
Su Shi 蘇軾 (1037–1101), Song dynasty writer, poet, painter, calligrapher, pharmacologist, gastronome and statesman, writing in the shi, ci and fu forms; notable works include the First and Second Chibifu ( The Red Cliffs, 1080–1086), Nian Nu Jiao: Chibi Huai Gu ( Remembering Chibi, to the tune of Nian Nu Jiao) and Shui diao ge tou ( Remembering Su Zhe on the Mid-Autumn Festival)

Japan

Japanese works
Imperial poetry anthologies:
 Shūi Wakashū 20 scrolls, 1,351 poems, ordered by ex-Emperor Kazan
 Goshūi Wakashū 20 scrolls, approx 1,200 poems, ordered in 1075 by Emperor Shirakawa, completed in 1086

Japanese poets
 Akazome Emon 赤染衛門 (956–1041) waka poet of the mid-Heian period; a member of both the Thirty-six Elder Poetic Sages and Kintō's 36 female poetry immortals (or "sages") of the Kamakura period
Fujiwara no Akisue 藤原顕季 (1055–1123), late Heian period poet and nobleman, member of the Fujiwara poetic and aristocratic clan
Fujiwara no Kintō 藤原公任, also known as "Shijō-dainagon" (966–1041), poet and critic; one of the Thirty-six Poetry Immortals; has poems in anthologies including the Shūi Wakashū, the Wakan rōeishū, and Shūi Wakashū
Fujiwara no Tametoki 藤原為時 (died 1029?), poet, minor official and governor of various provinces, scholar of Chinese literature and the father of Murasaki Shikibu ("Lady Murasaki")
Izumi Shikibu 和泉式部  nicknamed "The Floating Lady" 浮かれ女 for her series of passionate affairs (born c. 976 – year of death unknown, sometime after 1033), mid-Heian period poet, novelist and noblewoman; one of the Thirty-six Poetry Immortals; known for a sequence of affairs at the court in the capital; close friend of Akazome Emon, rival of Lady Murasaki, and mother of poet Koshikibu no Naishi; poetry praised by Fujiwara no Kinto
Minamoto no Shunrai, also "Minamoto Toshiyori", (c. 1057–1129) poet who compiled the Gosen Wakashū anthology; passed over to compile the Goshūi Wakashū, Shunrai's angry polemical, "Errors in the Goshūishū", apparently led Emperor Shirakawa to appoint him to compile the Kin'yō Wakashū imperial anthology, which was itself controversial
Murasaki Shikibu 紫 式 部, not her real name, which is unknown; often called "Lady Murasaki" (c. 973 – c. 1014 or 1025), Heian period novelist who wrote The Tale of Genji, poet, and a maid of honor of the imperial court
Nōin 能因, lay name: Tachibana no Nagayasu 橘永愷 (988 – c. 1051), late Heian period poet and monk; one of the "Thirty-six Medieval Poetry Immortals"
 Sei Shōnagon 清少納言  (c. 966–1017),  middle Heian Period author, poet and court lady who served Empress Teishi/Empress Sadako; best known as the author of The Pillow Book

References

Decades and years

 01
Poetry by century